Sam Vishal J.X. (born 28 September 1999) is an Indian playback singer and an independent vocalist. In 2019, he became the 2nd runner up of Super Singer 7 reality show. As the 2nd runner up of his season, he won a chance to sing songs for music director Anirudh Ravichander – 'Chitti Story' and 'Putta Story' (Telugu and Kannada versions of 'Kutti Story') for the film Master. Apart from film music, Sam Vishal is also a regular in independent music and is also seen releasing music independently. He has won the 'Sensational Singer at Digital' award at Blacksheep Digital Awards 2022.

Early life 
Sam Vishal was born in Thanjavur, Tamil Nadu to Mr. Xavier Sahayaraj and Mrs. Sofia Xavier. He also has a younger sister, Sifra Xavier. Sam Vishal has not learned music in the course of formal studies and comes from a family without a musical background. He completed his Bachelor's degree in English Literature at Loyola College, Chennai. During his college days, he started a band along with his friends and went on to participate in many competitions.

Career

Television 
In 2019, Sam Vishal made his first TV appearance when he got selected as one of the top 20 contestants in Super Singer 7. During the show, he also revealed that his close friend Deepan had sent his audio and video clips for Super Singer auditions without his knowledge and had informed him about this only after he had got selected. When he was nominated by the judges as the danger zone contestant of the week, he managed to get 65,50,285 votes in a total of 72,35,296 votes against Roshini which marks the highest number of votes that any contestant had got in the history of Super Singer. He was finally tied at the 3rd place along with Punya.

In 2020, he went on to participate Super Singer Champion of Champions featuring the Super Singer Stars along with his team Bachelor Band that included playback singer Srinisha Jayaseelan and DJ Sudhan aka DJ Black. According to sources, Bachelor Band was the first ever team to use a DJ in a musical show in the south. With this unique combo of musicians, they made their way into the finals as a direct finalist along with the Nighty Boys (Srinivasan Raghunathan, Diwakar and Manoj) and the Ooo Team (Maalavika Sundar, Santhosh Hariharan and Rangapriya).

As playback singer 
Sam Vishal made his debut as a playback singer with "Chitti Story" (Telugu version of Kutti Story) which was released in December 2020 in which he sang along with music director Anirudh Ravichander, and then also recorded 'Putta Story', the Kannada version of the same.

In May 2021 he sang "Talku Lessu Worku Moreu" for the movie Murungakkai Chips under the music composition of Dharan Kumar alongside Sivaangi .K.

In 2022 Vishal worked with Hiphop Tamizha on the song "Kanavugal" from Anbarivu and again with A. H. Kaashif for 'Poove' song from Rendagam. Sam then sang the Duet "Ninne Thaladanne" from The Life of Muthu with Rakshita Suresh composed by A. R. Rahman.

Independent Music 
On 13 February 2021, Media Masons released a single 'Kaarkuzhal Kanmani' starring Sam Vishal and Pragya Nagra which was directed by Ravoofa H.K. The music was composed by Sebastin Rozario while the lyrics were penned by Parthiv Mani and was sung by Sam Vishal himself.

Sam Vishal then provided his vocals for the song "Kannamma Eannamma" composed by Dev Prakash. He was also a part of the music video that starred Rio Raj,  Pavithra Lakshmi and Bala.

The second original of Media Masons 'Yarume Thevayillai' was released on 8 October 2021. The music video featured Sam Vishal, Shirley and A. H Kaashif who is the composer and lyricist of the song. The song was sung by Sam Vishal and Amina Rafiq.

The fifth original of Media Masons was titled as 'Theera Kadhalae' and the song was released on 22 April 2022. The music video starred Sam Vishal and Akshaya Hariharan and was directed by Sasikumar Jeyaraman. The music was composed by Santhosh Balaji and the song was sung by Sam Vishal. "Theera Kadhalae" marks the 25th song of Sam Vishal in his career.

Discography

Independent Songs

Film Songs

Awards and nominations

External links

References 

Loyola College, Chennai alumni
Living people
Indian musicians
Tamil musicians
1999 births
Indian male playback singers
21st-century Indian male singers
21st-century Indian singers
Singers from Tamil Nadu
Tamil playback singers
Telugu playback singers
Kannada playback singers